Williamsburg is an unincorporated community in Calhoun County, in the U.S. state of Georgia.

History
A post office called Williamsburg was established in 1873, and remained in operation until 1913. Variant names are "Williamsburg Crossroads" and "Williamsburgh".

The Georgia General Assembly incorporated Williamsburg as a town in 1887. The town's municipal charter was repealed in 1995.

References

Former municipalities in Georgia (U.S. state)
Unincorporated communities in Georgia (U.S. state)
Unincorporated communities in Calhoun County, Georgia
Populated places disestablished in 1995